Hadena silenes is a species of moth of the  family Noctuidae. It is found in Europe, Turkey, Israel, Iran and Turkmenistan.

Description
E. silenes Hbn. ( sejuncta H.-Sch.) (20 d). Forewing ochreous white with redbrown suffusion; claviform stigma black; orbicular and reniform large, their centres brown ringed with white; submarginal line white with black wedge-shaped marks in front of it; hindwing brown, deeper towards termen. — Larva pale redbrown; dorsal and subdorsal lines fine, whitish grey; lateral stripe broad and whitish; spiracles white with black rings ; on seeds of various kinds of Silene. A South European species, found in S. France, [Italy], Spain, Sicily, Hungary and Macedonia; also in Armenia, Palestine, and Mesopotamia.

Subspecies
Hadena silenes silenes
Hadena silenes variegata (Turkey)
Hadena silenes mesopotamica
Hadena silenes csorbai

Biology
Adults are on wing from March to June in one generation in the Near East.

The larvae feed on the seeds of  Silene and Cucubalus species.

References

External links
 Hadeninae of Israel

Hadena
Moths of Europe
Moths of Asia
Moths described in 1822